Kateřina Siniaková (born 10 May 1996) is a Czech professional tennis player who is the current world No. 1 in doubles.

She is a seven-time Grand Slam champion in women's doubles, partnering compatriot Barbora Krejčíková, having completed the career Super Slam in the discipline. The pairing also finished runners-up at two WTA Finals and the 2021 Australian Open, and Siniaková reached the final at the 2017 US Open with Lucie Hradecká. She became world No. 1 for the first time in October 2018, holding the top ranking for a total of 83 weeks, and has won 22 doubles titles on the WTA Tour, including the 2021 WTA Finals and two at WTA 1000 level. 

In singles, Siniaková reached her career-high ranking of world No. 31 in October 2018, and has won three WTA titles, at the Shenzhen Open and Swedish Open in 2017, and at the Slovenia Open in 2022. Her best major result was at the 2019 French Open, upsetting world No. 1 and reigning US and Australian Open champion Naomi Osaka en route to the fourth round; she has also reached the third round at seven other Grand Slam tournaments. 

Siniaková was part of the Czech team which won the 2018 Fed Cup, and also won doubles gold at the 2020 Tokyo Olympics alongside Krejčíková.

Personal life and background
Siniaková was born to a Czech mother Hana, an accountant, and Russian father Dmitry, a former boxer and her coach. Her younger brother Daniel (born 2003) is also a professional tennis player. Since the COVID-19 quarantine at the 2021 Australian Open, Siniaková has been dating fellow Czech tennis player Tomáš Macháč.

Junior career
She was ranked the world No. 2 junior tennis player in December 2012. With fellow Czech Barbora Krejčíková, she won the girls' doubles titles at the French Open, at Wimbledon and the US Open in 2013.

Professional career

2012–14: Debut, and first WTA doubles title

She began playing on the ITF Women's Circuit in the Czech Republic in June 2012. There in a doubles competition, she won her first ITF title. She then made big progress in 2013. She started outside top 1000 in both singles and doubles, but finished year inside top 200 in singles and top 300 in doubles. In March 2013, she won her first ITF singles title at the $10k Frauenfeld, defeating Kathinka von Deichmann in the three sets. Two weeks later, Siniaková made her debut on the WTA Tour in the qualifying draw of Miami Open. She passed qualifying defeating Mandy Minella and Alexa Glatch, but then lost a three-set encounter with Garbiñe Muguruza in the first round of the main draw. In November 2013, she reached her first major ITF final at the $75k Sharm El Sheikh event in doubles, but lost alongside Anna Morgina.

At the 2014 Australian Open, she made her Grand Slam debut after passing qualifications, but then lost to Zarina Diyas in the first round of the main draw. In July 2014, she won her first match on WTA Tour at the İstanbul Cup defeating Julia Glushko in the first round. Nearly after that, she reached her first WTA doubles final at the Silicon Valley Classic alongside Paula Kania, but they lost to Garbiñe Muguruza and Carla Suárez Navarro. She then went one step further, winning her first WTA doubles title at the Tashkent Open, partnering Aleksandra Krunić. Right after that she made her top 100 debut in doubles. In October 2014, she reached singles semifinals of the Premier-level Kremlin Cup. She lost her semifinal match against Anastasia Pavlyuchenkova. This brought her into the top 100 in singles, and a week later she won the titke at the $50k Open Nantes, defeating Ons Jabeur. She finished year with another title at the Open de Limoges, alongside Renata Voráčová.

2015–16: Top 50 in both singles and doubles

At the Australian Open, Siniaková had her first singles Grand Slam win, defeating Elena Vesnina in the first round. In the following round, she lost to Irina-Camelia Begu. In March 2015, she won her first WTA 1000 match at the Premier Mandatory-level Indian Wells Open, after defeating another Russian player, Evgeniya Rodina. In May 2015, she had good performances, reaching the singles semifinal and taking the doubles title with Belinda Bencic at the Prague Open. However, after a run to the third-round at the French Open alongside Bencic, she reached top 50. In June 2015, she reached the quarterfinal of the Premier-level Birmingham Classic. By the end of the year, she was standing out more in doubles, reaching final of the Tashkent Open and semifinal of the Premier-level Kremlin Cup.

Siniaková started slowly into the 2016 season, but then shone at the French Open, where she reached semifinals in doubles alongside Barbora Krejčíková. Then, at 2016 Wimbledon, she reached her first singles Grand Slam third round, after defeating Pauline Parmentier and 30th seed Caroline Garcia before being defeated by former world No. 2, Agnieszka Radwańska. Things even got better in July 2016, when she reached her first singles WTA final in Båstad, at the Swedish Open. She lost the final to Laura Siegemund. But then she advanced to the doubles quarterfinals of the US Open, alongside Krejčíková. She followed this up with another singles WTA final at the Japan Women's Open in Tokyo, but lost to Christina McHale. In late October, after a first-round loss at the Kremlin Cup, she made her top-50 debut in singles.

2017: First WTA singles titles, US Open doubles final

Siniaková had a strong start to the 2017 season, winning her first WTA singles title at the Shenzhen Open.  Siniaková began the tournament by defeating Peng Shuai in the first round in two sets, followed by a victory over world No. 4, Simona Halep in three sets, claiming her first win over a top-10 player. Her run continued by beating qualifier Nina Stojanović and world No. 9, Johanna Konta, in three sets. In the final, she defeated Alison Riske to take the title. She then struggled with results, not even reaching a quarterfinal until May 2017. However, during that period, she had success in doubles where she reached the final of the Premier-Mandatory Indian Wells Open and Premier-level Charleston Open alongside Lucie Hradecká. Then in May 2017, she reached the quarterfinal of the Prague Open in singles, as well as the final in doubles. She continued this form, with good results in doubles, reaching the quarterfinals of the Premier Mandatory Madrid Open and Premier 5 Italian Open with Hradecka. She then reached the doubles semifinal of the French Open for the second year in a row, alongside Lucie Hradecká.  

However, in singles, things still were not good until Swedish Open, where she reached her second final.  A losing finalist in 2016, this time she succeeded in winning the title, after she defeated world No. 6 Caroline Wozniacki in the final. On her way to the title, she also defeated two top-20 players, Anastasija Sevastova and Caroline Garcia. She then continued struggling with results in singles, but made did make progress in doubles. At the US Open, she reached her first Grand Slam doubles final. Alongside Lucie Hradecká, they did not drop a singles set on their way to the final, but then lost to Latisha Chan and Martina Hingis. Later in the year, she reached the quarterfinal of the Premier-Mandatory China Open and semifinal of the Premier-level Kremlin Cup in doubles. As a result of that, she achieved No. 11 ranking in doubles and finished year as world No. 13 , while in singles she ended as world No. 49.

2018: World No. 1 in doubles, French Open and Wimbledon trophies in doubles

Siniaková started year well, playing at the Shenzhen Open, where she reached the finals in both singles and doubles, but lost to Simona Halep in both. Her run to the singles final included a win over Maria Sharapova in the semifinals. She played in the doubles final alongside Barbora Krejčíková, but they lost to Halep and Irina-Camelia Begu. She then lost to Elina Svitolina in the first round match at the Australian Open, and in doubles reached the third round with Krejcikova. Siniaková then reached the quarterfinals in singles at the Premier-level St. Petersburg Ladies' Trophy right after the Australian Open, and then in May, she reached the quarterfinal of the Prague Open and the semifinal of the Nuremberg Cup. During that period, things got better in doubles where she first reached the semifinals of the Premier 5 Qatar Open and then the final of the Premier Mandatory Miami Open.

In the summer, she had her biggest success in doubles. Alongside Barbora Krejčíková, she won two Grand Slam titles at the French Open and Wimbledon, while in singles at both tournaments, she reached third rounds. Winning two slams back to back and winning the junior and senior grand slam titles at these two events was a great achievement for Siniaková and Krejcikova.

 At the US Open, she reached the third round in singles, and made the semifinals in doubles, alongside Krejčíková. During the Asian hardcourt tour, Siniaková alsö improved her singles results. First, she reached the quarterfinal of the Premier 5 Wuhan Open, where she also defeated world No. 4 Caroline Garcia and former No. 1, Garbiñe Muguruza. She followed this with another quarterfinal, but this time at the Premier Mandatory China Open, where she defeated world No. 11, Kiki Bertens, but later lost to world No. 2, Caroline Wozniacki. At the end of the year, she reached the final of the Tour Championships in doubles, alongside Krejčíková, but they lost to Tímea Babos and Kristina Mladenovic. On 22 October 2018, she made her then-highest singles ranking of place 31, while on the same day, she became world No. 1 in doubles, along with Krejčíková. She finished year with the same positions, in singles and in doubles.

2019–20: Struggle in singles & success in doubles

During the first four months of 2019, Siniaková did not have any significant results in singles, but she was more successful in doubles. She started year with the semifinal of the Premier-level Brisbane International, followed with title at the another Premier-level tournament, Sydney International with Krejcikova. Then, at the Australian Open, alongside Krejčíková, she reached the quarterfinal and completed reaching the quarterfinals at all four Grand Slam tournaments. She did not stop there, reaching quarterfinal of the Premier 5 Dubai Championships and soon after that the final of the Premier Mandatory Indian Wells Open. Then, on clay court, she started with better results in singles, first reaching quarterfinal of the Prague Open, followed by semifinal at Nuremberg. At the Madrid Open and Italian Open, she lost early in singles, but reached quarterfinal and semifinal, respectively, in doubles. Siniaková then made progress at the French Open, reaching her first Grand Slam singles round of 16, after defeating world No. 1,Naomi Osaka. She then lost to Madison Keys in the quarterfinal-match. The following month, she continued to struggle with results in singles, but reached the semifinal of Wimbledon in doubles, alongside Krejčíková. In late August, she reached another WTA Tour singles semifinal at the Bronx Open. However, by the end of the year, she continued to struggle in singles, but in doubles she and Krejcikova won the Canadian Open and Linz Open. At the WTA Finals, alongside Krejčíková, she exited in the round-robin stage, after winning one match and losing two others. She finished year as world No. 58 in singles and No. 7 in doubles, after spending the whole year inside the top 60 in singles and top 10 in doubles.

During the 2020 season, Siniaková continued to struggle with results in singles. Her first stand out result was when she defeated former world No. 1, Angelique Kerber, in the first round of the Premier 5 Italian Open, in straight sets. In the following round, she lost to Daria Kasatkina. After that, she reached the quarterfinal of the Internationaux de Strasbourg and then the third round of the French Open. In doubles, she had strong start, winning the title at the Shenzhen Open in the opening week. She followed this with a strong performance at the Australian Open, where alongside Krejčíková, she reached the semifinal. With this result, she completed the achievement of reaching the quarter finals all four Grand Slam tournaments. Siniakova then reached the semifinal of the Premier 5 Qatar Open. 
Then, after six months absence of the WTA Tour due to COVID-19 outbreak, Siniaková started slow with the semifinal of the Prague Open, first round of Cincinnati Open, second round at the US Open, but then reached the quarterfinals of the Italian Open and semifinal of the French Open. The end of the year saw her reach the doubles final of the Linz Open, alongside Lucie Hradecká. Siniaková spent the whole year inside top 70 in singles, while in doubles inside top 10. She finished the season as the world No. 64 in singles, and No. 8 in doubles.

2021: Second French Open doubles title, world No. 1 in doubles

There was a positive start to 2021, when Siniaková and Krejčíková reached the doubles final at the Australian Open, before losing to Elise Mertens and Aryna Sabalenka.

At the Madrid Open, Siniaková and Krejčíková won the title, defeating Demi Schuurs and Gabriela Dabrowski in the final for their biggest title since Wimbledon 2018.

At the French Open in doubles, Siniaková and Krejčíková defeated the Plíšková twins in an all Czech quarterfinals and Bernarda Pera & Magda Linette in the semifinals to reach their second French Open final. They then beat Bethanie Mattek-Sands and Iga Świątek in straight sets to claim their second title at Roland Garros, while Siniakova’s partner Barbora Krejčíková won her maiden Grand Slam singles title at the same event. As a result, Krejčíková and Siniaková reclaimed the No. 1 and No. 2 spots in the doubles rankings, respectively. 

At the Olympics, the pair won the gold medal in women's doubles, defeating the Swiss pair of Belinda Bencic and Viktoria Golubic in the gold medal match. The pair unexpectedly lost in the first round of the US Open. However, the season ended on a high for Siniaková as she partnered with Jeļena Ostapenko to win the doubles title in Moscow, and then reteamed with Krejčíková to win the WTA Finals doubles title in Guadalajara, going through the tournament unbeaten. Consequently, Siniaková rose to the top of the rankings and ended the year as the world No. 1 doubles player.

In singles, Siniaková had a few significant wins. She reached the quarterfinals at the WTA 250 in Istanbul, in April before losing to Elisa Mertens. In May, she beat Clara Tauson, Serena Williams and Caroline Garcia at the WTA 250 Parma Open, before losing to Coco Gauff in the semifinals. Siniaková had a good run to the third round at the French Open, before losing to Tamara Zindansek. Siniaková then reached her first WTA singles final in several years at the Bad Homburg Open where she lost to Angelique Kerber.
With her summer singles form she reached third round at Wimbledon, before losing to eventual champion Ashleigh Barty. Siniaková then reached the quarterfinal of the Prague Open in July, being beaten heavily by her double partner Krejčíková who would also go in to take the title. Siniaková beat former world No. 1 Muguruza at the WTA-1000 tournament in Montreal in August and then in October 2021, defeated returning former No. 1, Kim Clijsters, at the Indian Wells Open. She ended the year ranked number 49 for singles.

2022: Career Golden Slam, Australian Open, Wimbledon & US Open champion, third singles title
Siniaková began the 2022 season by winning the doubles title at the Melbourne Summer Set 2 with Bernarda Pera.

As the top seed at the Australian Open, Siniaková reached the doubles final with Krejčíková, in which they defeated Anna Danilina and Beatriz Haddad Maia to claim their first Australian Open women's doubles title.

Siniaková’s season in doubles was affected by an elbow injury to Krejčíková in Doha in February that meant they did not play together again until Wimbledon. Siniaková herself was affected by an abdominal injury that forced her to withdraw in matches in Miami and Madrid. However, she won the doubles title at the German Open with Storm Sanders in June. The Czech duo was forced to withdraw from the French Open Doubles draw as well after Krejčíková tested positive for COVID-19.

In singles, Siniaková’s grass-court season did not go well as she had tough draws against Simona Halep and Bianca Andreescu in Bad Homburg and Berlin. At Wimbledon, she lost in the first round in singles to first-time qualifier Maja Chwalińska in straight sets. At the same tournament in doubles, she reached the final with Krejčíková and won the title for a second time at this major defeating top seeds Elise Mertens and Zhang Shuai, in straight sets.

After poor results in singles, Siniaková dropped down to play an ITF tournament in Poland in August, which she won beating Magda Linette. At the US Open she won the doubles title with Krejčíková completing the career Golden Slam.
Siniaková followed up this success in doubles a week later, with her third singles title at the Portorož Open in Slovenia, defeating 2022 Wimbledon champion Elena Rybakina in the final, in three sets. 
Siniaková then teamed up with Kristina Mladenovic to win the doubles title at the Jasmin Open.

She had another good win in singles to beat top-20 player Haddad Maia in the first round of the last WTA 1000 of the year at the Guadalajara Open and made the semifinals in doubles alongside Krejčíková.
The pair then played the 2022 WTA Finals - Doubles in Fort Worth, Texas. The Czechs went undefeated in the round robin stage but were defeated in the final by Veronika Kudermetova and Elise Mertens

2023: Australian Open doubles title 
Siniaková began season at the 2023 Adelaide International 1 where she failed to qualify in singles, but teamed up with Storm Hunter to reach the final in which they were defeated by Taylor Townsend and Asia Muhammed.
At the Australian Open, she reunited with Krejčíková in the women’s doubles, where they won their 24th consecutive major match, and their seventh doubles Grand Slam title and for the first time, defended a major title. With this win, Siniaková retained the world No. 1 doubles ranking.

National representation
In February 2017, she was nominated to the Fed Cup team for the first time by the captain Petr Pála as she was the third best ranked woman Czech tennis player (considering Petra Kvitová's injury) after Karolína Plíšková and Barbora Strýcová. Anyway, the captain announced eventually that Siniaková would first of all collect experience.

Siniaková along with Barbora Krejčíková made history for Czech Republic as they won the gold medal in the women's tennis double at the 2020 Summer Olympics.

Siniakova was part of the Czech team at the 2020-21 Billie Jean King Cup Finals in Prague, where she played doubles alongside Lucie Hradecká.
She was also part of the Czech team at the 2022 Billie Jean King Cup Finals held in Glasgow, Scotland. In the group stage she teamed up with Markéta Vondroušová to win a doubles tie against Poland and earned the winning point by beating Coco Gauff in singles.

Career statistics

Grand Slam tournament performance timelines

Singles

Doubles

Grand Slam tournament finals

Doubles: 9 (7 titles, 2 runner-ups)

Olympic Games finals

Doubles: 1 (gold medal)

Year-end championships finals

Doubles: 3 (1 title, 2 runner-ups)

References

External links

 
 
 

1996 births
Living people
Sportspeople from Hradec Králové
Czech female tennis players
French Open junior champions
Wimbledon junior champions
US Open (tennis) junior champions
Grand Slam (tennis) champions in girls' doubles
Czech people of Russian descent
Grand Slam (tennis) champions in women's doubles
French Open champions
Wimbledon champions
Olympic tennis players of the Czech Republic
Tennis players at the 2020 Summer Olympics
Olympic gold medalists for the Czech Republic
Medalists at the 2020 Summer Olympics
Olympic medalists in tennis
WTA number 1 ranked doubles tennis players
ITF World Champions